This is a list of video games and computer based on cartoon television series and movies. The list does not include games based on Japanese anime, which are separately listed at List of video games based on anime or manga.

See also
List of video games based on anime or manga
List of animated television series
List of Looney Tunes video games
List of Hanna-Barbera-based video games
List of Disney video games
List of Teenage Mutant Ninja Turtles video games
List of Tom and Jerry video games